Pirjo Muranen (née Manninen, born 8 March 1981 in Rovaniemi) is a retired Finnish cross-country skier. She won a bronze medal in the 4 × 5 km relay at the 2010 Winter Olympics in Vancouver. Muranen won five medals at the FIS Nordic World Ski Championships with three golds (Individual sprint: 2001, 4 × 5 km relay: 2007, 2009), a silver (Team sprint: 2005, with Riitta-Liisa Lassila), and a bronze (Individual sprint: 2009). She married on 30 June 2007; previously known by her maiden name of Pirjo Manninen.

Muranen also has sixteen additional victories up to 15 km from 2000 to 2002. She is the younger sister of Nordic combined skier Hannu. At the 2007 FIS Nordic World Ski Championships in Sapporo, they became the first brother-sister combination to win gold medals at the same championships.

Muranen retired from the sport in April 2011. She has then worked as a cross-country skiing pundit and studio commentator for Finland's national public-broadcasting company Yle.

Cross-country skiing results
All results are sourced from the International Ski Federation (FIS).

Olympic Games
1 medal – (1 bronze)

World Championships
 6 medals – (3 gold, 1 silver, 2 bronze)

a.  Cancelled due to extremely cold weather.

World Cup

Season standings

Individual podiums
5 victories – (5 ) 
15 podiums – (14 , 1 )

Team podiums
3 victories – (3 ) 
14 podiums – (9 , 5 )

See also
List of Olympic medalist families

References

External links

Official website 

1981 births
Living people
People from Rovaniemi
Cross-country skiers at the 2010 Winter Olympics
Finnish female cross-country skiers
Olympic cross-country skiers of Finland
Olympic bronze medalists for Finland
Olympic medalists in cross-country skiing
FIS Nordic World Ski Championships medalists in cross-country skiing
Medalists at the 2010 Winter Olympics
Sportspeople from Lapland (Finland)
21st-century Finnish women